Gabriel I. H. Williams is a Liberian journalist. He worked for some time for The Inquirer. He is the former Secretary General and president of the Press Union of Liberia (PUL), and was a founding member of the Association of Liberian Journalists.
In 2002 he published Liberia: The Heart of Darkness : Accounts of Liberia's Civil War and Its Destabilizing Effects in West Africa.

References

Liberian journalists
Americo-Liberian people
Living people
Liberian writers
Year of birth missing (living people)